Her, formerly Dattch, is a geosocial networking app geared towards lesbian, queer, bisexual and straight women; non-binary people; and transgender people (including trans men and trans women). It is available for iOS and Android.

Users can join the app with their Facebook account or email address. Cisgender men are not allowed to create profiles on the platform. As of May 2018, the application is available in 55 countries.

The app was founded by Robyn Exton and launched in September 2013.

Investors 
In March 2013, Her (then Dattch) received €40,000 in funding upon joining the start-up incubator Wayra Academy, owned by Telefonica.

In September 2013, the application raised £100,000 from three investors including founder of W3 Ltd, Yannick Pons and Investor & Chairman of YPlan Andy Phillipps.

In March 2014, Dattch received a US$25,000 investment prize after being awarded with Best Design at 2014's LAUNCH Festival.

In March 2015, after $1 million in funding from investors such as Alexis Ohanian, and Garry Tan and Michael Birch from Y Combinator, Dattch was renamed to Her.

Reception 
Her has been well received by LGBTQ communities. In ReadWrite'''s article, "Why Queer Women Need Their Own Dating App," Dattch was called "one of its kind" and "the app queer women have been waiting for." Lesbian news portal Autostraddle said, "it is a pleasure seeing technology created with women’s needs being considered so carefully."

 Cultural references 
Her appeared in the Channel 4 documentary, How to Be a Young Billionaire'', which televised in the UK in 2015.

See also 
 Homosocialization
 Taimi

References 

IOS software
Geosocial networking
Mobile social software
Lesbian-related websites
Online dating services of the United Kingdom
Android (operating system) software
Same sex online dating